Eszter Ónodi (born 17 February 1973) is a Hungarian film and theater actress.

Selected filmography

 Az alkimista és a szűz (1998) - Eszténa
 Portugál (1999) - Wife
 Meseautó (2000) - Vera
 A Kind of America (2002) - Eszter
 Boldog születésnapot! (2003) - Gyöngyi
 A Kind of America 2 (2008) - Eszter
 Aglaya (2012) - Sabine
 Anyám és más futóbolondok a családból (2015) - Mom
 Aranyélet (TV series (2015-) - Janka

References

Hungarian film actresses
1973 births
Living people
Actresses from Budapest